Oustalet's sunbird (Cinnyris oustaleti) is a species of bird in the family Nectariniidae.
It is found in Angola, Malawi, Tanzania, and Zambia.

References

Oustalet's sunbird
Birds of Central Africa
Oustalet's sunbird
Taxonomy articles created by Polbot